The 1931 Texas A&M Aggies football team represented the Agricultural and Mechanical College of Texas (now known as Texas A&M University) as a member the Southwest Conference (SWC) during the 1931 college football season. Led by third-year head coach Matty Bell, the Aggies compiled and overall record of 7–3, with a mark of 3–2 in conference play, placing third in the SWC.

Schedule

References

Texas AandM
Texas A&M Aggies football seasons
Texas AandM